Vikram Vishnu Pillay is a hockey midfielder from India.

Career

Early career
He helped India winning gold in Hockey Junior World Cup in 2001.

Senior career
Vikram made his international debut for India in 2002 during a 4 nation tournament in Adelaide, South Australia. He was a member of Indian team in Athens Olympics in 2004, where India finished in 7th place.

References
 Vikram Pillai Profile

1981 births
Field hockey players at the 2004 Summer Olympics
Field hockey players at the 2006 Commonwealth Games
Field hockey players at the 2010 Commonwealth Games
Commonwealth Games silver medallists for India
Commonwealth Games medallists in field hockey
Field hockey players from Pune
Living people
Olympic field hockey players of India
Asian Games medalists in field hockey
World Series Hockey players
Field hockey players at the 2002 Asian Games
Field hockey players at the 2010 Asian Games
Indian male field hockey players
Asian Games silver medalists for India
Asian Games bronze medalists for India
Medalists at the 2002 Asian Games
Medalists at the 2010 Asian Games
2006 Men's Hockey World Cup players
2010 Men's Hockey World Cup players
Medallists at the 2010 Commonwealth Games